Perhaps Transparent is a Jersey City, New Jersey based independent record label founded by Gabriel Walsh and Stephen Connolly. The label releases psychedelic and psychedelic folk. Artists on this label tend to include song, narrative or conceptual structures that are deliberately complicated and/or obscure – Your Team Ring buries puzzles in its albums, Flaming Fire utilizes classic Greek theater elements, Pothole Skinny experiment in the sounds of psychedelic folk, IE: the woods-folk-avant-dark-strings, and Irene Moon's music is principally about her interests and research in entomology. PG Six, aka Pat Gubler from Tower Recordings explores song craft through the resurgence of 1960's British Follk revival and experimental bray harp drones. Through live CD-R releases, and the vinyl versions of his Amish Records releases, one can get a keen glimpse of Pat's Musical journey.

Artists on this label
 American Watercolor Movement
 Calvin, Don't Jump!
 Flaming Fire
 Irene Moon
 PG Six
 Outhern Acific
 Pothole Skinny
 Stephen Connolly
 Your Team Ring
 Fireworks Collage Project with Daniel Carter

See also 
 List of record labels

External links
 Official site
 Emusic Download page

American independent record labels
New Jersey record labels
Psychedelic rock record labels
Psychedelic folk record labels
Mass media in Hudson County, New Jersey